The Seventeenth Dynasty of Egypt (notated Dynasty XVII, alternatively 17th Dynasty or Dynasty 17) was a dynasty of pharaohs that ruled in Upper Egypt during the late Second Intermediate Period, approximately from 1580 to 1550 BC. Its mainly Theban rulers are contemporary with the Hyksos of the  Fifteenth Dynasty and succeed the Sixteenth Dynasty, which was also based in Thebes.

In March 2012, French archeologists examining a limestone door in the Precinct of Amun-Re at Karnak discovered hieroglyphs with the name Senakhtenre, the first evidence of this king dating to his lifetime.

The last two kings of the dynasty opposed the Hyksos rule over Egypt and initiated a war that would rid Egypt of the Hyksos kings and began a period of unified rule, the New Kingdom of Egypt.

Kamose, the second son of Seqenenre Tao and last king of the Seventeenth Dynasty, was the brother of Ahmose I, the first king of the Eighteenth Dynasty.

Some mainstream scholars have suggested that the Seventeenth dynasty of Egypt had Nubian ancestry due to the expanded presence of Nubians in Egypt during that time period and the craniofacial evidence from X-ray examinations of some members of this dynasty such as Seqenenre Tao and Tetisheri who displayed strong affinities with contemporary Nubians. Donald Redford explicitly argues that Egyptians "entered into the service of the king of Kush" between seventeenth and sixteenth centuries BC, citing historical texts along with archaeological evidence that showed an increased Nubian presence from the third Cataract on the Nile as far north as Deir Rifeh. Redford summarises that a shared "community of interest" existed which coincided with the influx of Nubian pottery and weapons in Upper Egypt. There is no conclusive evidence that the founder of the dynasty, Rahotep, was of Nubian origin however and the dynasty is recognized as a native Egyptian dynasty by many scholars.

Pharaohs of the 17th Dynasty
The Pharaohs of the 17th Dynasty ruled for approximately 30 years. Known rulers of the 17th Dynasty are as follows:

Finally, king Nebmaatre may have been a ruler of the early 17th Dynasty.

See also
 List of pharaohs

References

External links
 Kings of the Second Intermediate Period: University College London

 
States and territories established in the 16th century BC
States and territories disestablished in the 16th century BC
17
16th century BC in Egypt
2nd-millennium BC establishments in Egypt
2nd-millennium BC disestablishments in Egypt
17